Brendan O'Brien may refer to:

Brendan O'Brien (bishop) (born 1943), Roman Catholic archbishop of Kingston, Ontario, Canada
Brendan O'Brien (cricketer) (born 1942), Irish former cricketer
Brendan O'Brien (journalist), senior Irish journalist on RTÉ's Prime Time current affairs programme
Brendan O'Brien (record producer) (born 1960), record producer, mixer, engineer, and musician
Brendan O'Brien (screenwriter), American screenwriter
Brendan O'Brien (voice actor) (born 1962), actor and voice of many Crash Bandicoot characters